Eugene Gelfand (June 17, 1919 – March 23, 1987) was a Democratic member of the Pennsylvania House of Representatives.

References

Democratic Party members of the Pennsylvania House of Representatives
1919 births
1987 deaths
20th-century American politicians